Ilex chapaensis is a species of holly native to China. It is a deciduous shrub. The fruits are black when mature. The fruits are drupes which are eaten by civets that disperse the seeds through their droppings. It is grown as an ornamental plant.

External links
 Ilex chapaensis info

chapaensis
Endemic flora of China
Garden plants of Asia